Ann-Marie Pfiffner (born 13 May 1969 in Dubuque) is an American sport shooter. She competed in rifle shooting events at the 1992 Summer Olympics.

Olympic results

References

1969 births
Living people
ISSF rifle shooters
American female sport shooters
Shooters at the 1992 Summer Olympics
Olympic shooters of the United States
Sportspeople from Dubuque, Iowa
Pan American Games medalists in shooting
Pan American Games gold medalists for the United States
Pan American Games bronze medalists for the United States
Shooters at the 1995 Pan American Games
21st-century American women
20th-century American women